Tkocz is a surname. Notable people with the surname include:

 Andrzej Tkocz (born 1951), Polish speedway rider
 Jarosław Tkocz (born 1973), Polish footballer
 Stanisław Tkocz (1936–2016), Polish speedway rider

See also
 

Polish-language surnames